Isaac Angbo (born 22 February 1966) is an Ivorian judoka. He competed in the men's middleweight event at the 1992 Summer Olympics.

References

External links

1966 births
Living people
Ivorian male judoka
Olympic judoka of Ivory Coast
Judoka at the 1992 Summer Olympics
Place of birth missing (living people)
African Games medalists in judo
Competitors at the 1991 All-Africa Games
African Games gold medalists for Ivory Coast